The Sheffield Symphony Orchestra is an orchestra based in Sheffield, England.

Founded in 1956, the orchestra plays a challenging repertoire including many works written in the last hundred years. The orchestra normally augments a season of four concerts with two events at New Year featuring Viennese classics amongst other lighter works.

After the departure of John Longstaff in 2011, SSO welcomed the acclaimed Australian conductor Dane Lame to the post of musical director who held the post for two years until being replaced by Juan Ortuno.

References

External links 
Official site

British symphony orchestras
English orchestras
Musical groups established in 1956
Musical groups from Sheffield
1956 establishments in England